Kharagpur may also refer to:
Kharagpur, a city in Paschim Medinipur district, West Bengal, India.
Haveli Kharagpur, a town in Munger district, Bihar, India
Kharagpur Raj, a medieval chieftaincy centred in Haveli Kharagpur of Bihar
Kharagpur Railway Settlement, in West Bengal
Kharagpur railway station, in West Bengal
Kharagpur subdivision, a subdivision of the Paschim Medinipur district, West Bengal, India
Kharagpur I, community development block, in West Bengal
Kharagpur II, community development block, in West Bengal
Kharagpur (Vidhan Sabha constituency), an assembly constituency in Paschim Medinipur district in West Bengal, India
Kharagpur Sadar (Vidhan Sabha constituency), an assembly constituency in Paschim Medinipur district in West Bengal, India